Luarsab II the Holy Martyr (1592 – 21 June (O.S.), 1 July (N.S.), 1622), of the Bagrationi dynasty, was a king of Kartli (eastern Georgia) from 1606 to 1615. He is known for his martyr’s death at the hands of the Persian shah Abbas I. The Georgian Orthodox Church regards him as saint and marks his memory on the day of his death, July 1.

Life
Luarsab ascended the Kartlian throne at the age of 14 after his father, Giorgi X, suddenly died in 1606. During his minority, the government was actually run by a royal tutor Shadiman Baratashvili. It was when Abbas I succeeded in driving the Ottoman armies out of eastern Georgia, leaving a Persian force in Tbilisi, and confirming Luarsab as king of Kartli. The Ottomans attempted to remove Luarsab, sending in Georgia a large army, only to be destroyed by the Georgian general Giorgi Saakadze at the Battle of Tashiskari, 1609. After this victory, Luarsab was granted again the control of the citadel of Tbilisi and the shah married his sister Tinatin, 1610. Late in 1611, Luarsab himself married Makrine, a sister of a lower-class noble Saakadze. The great nobles of the realm led by Shadiman Baratashvili convinced the king that Saakadze was a Persian agent seeking a royal crown. They induced Luarsab to divorce Makrine and forced Saakadze into exile to Persia. Shah Abbas indeed demanded more loyalty and obedience from the Georgians and encouraged a khan of Kazakh Mohammad to trouble the Kartlian lands. In 1612, Luarsab had Mohammad Khan assassinated and allied with another Georgian monarch, Teimuraz I of Kakheti to counter an anticipated Persian aggression. Early in 1614, a large Persian army invaded Kakheti, destroying several settlements on its way, and moved into Kartli. Luarsab and Teimuraz fled to a western Georgian Kingdom of Imereti. George III of Imereti refused to surrender the refugees. Abbas threatened Kartli with ruin, promising that if Luarsab submitted, he would conclude a peace. In October 1615, Luarsab surrendered to save his kingdom from being wiped out, and, refusing to convert to Islam, was incarcerated first in Astarabad and then somewhere near Shiraz. The Georgians attempted to free their king through the mediation of Tsar Mikhail I of Russia. However, the negotiations yielded no results and, in 1622, Luarsab was executed (strangled with a bow string) on the orders of the shah at the fortress of Qal‘eh-ye Golāb in southwest Iran.

References

External links

 Luarsab I
 Luarsab the Martyr, an essay by Ilia Chavchavadze, 1886.
 The Orthodox Church in America website

Bagrationi dynasty of the Kingdom of Kartli
Saints of Georgia (country)
1592 births
1622 deaths
Safavid appointed kings of Kartli
Eastern Orthodox monarchs
Eastern Orthodox Christians from Georgia (country)
Christians executed for refusing to convert to Islam
17th-century Christian saints
17th-century Eastern Orthodox martyrs
Christian saints killed by Muslims
People executed by Safavid Iran
Rebellions against Safavid Iran
17th-century people of Safavid Iran